Fariba Vafi (born 21 January 1963) is an Iranian writer. She is of Azerbaijani descent.

Biography 
Fariba Vafi was born in Tabriz on 21 January 1963 in a middle-class family.  She started writing early in school and later authored short stories.

Her first short story collection Dar Omghe Sahneh (In the depth of the Stage) was published by Cheshmeh Publishers in 1996. Her second, Hatta Vagti Mikhandim [Even While we Are Laughing] was published by "Nashr-e Markaz" Publishing co. in the fall of 1999 and translated into Armenian in 2020. In 2002 Nashr-e Markaz published Vafi's first novel Parandeye Man [My Bird]. This novel received the Golshiri and Yalda awards and has had thirty-five printings. It was translated into English by Syracuse University Press in 2009, into Italian by Ponte 33 in 2010, into German in 2012 by Rotbuch Verlag and into Kurdish in 2011 and into Turkish 2016 and into Armenian in 2020.

Her second novel Tarlan was published by Nashr- e Markaz in 2004, it was translated into German by Sujet Verlag in 2015 and won LiBeratur prize in 2017. Her novel The Dream of Tibet was published by Nashr-e Markaz in 2005 and translated into German in 2019. This novel received the Hooshang Golshiri Literary Award for 'Best Novel'. Her novel The secret in the Alleys was published in 2008 and was translated into French  by Zulma in 2011 and also into Norwegian. a short story collection  An den Regen  was published in German in 2021 and a short story  Die Reise im Zug  was also published in German in the same year. 

Her third collection On the Way of Villa was published by Cheshmeh in 2008.
The Moon Becomes Full is her other novel which published in 2011 and in the same year she published her short story collection  All The Horizon . Her last novel is  After The End published in 2014,  her last short story collection is  Without Wind Without Oarspublished in 2016. Some of her stories were translated into English, Italian, Turkish, Russian, Swedish, Japanese and Arabic. Vafi is married and has a daughter and a son. She lives in Tehran.

Works 

 1986: Dar Omq-e-sahneh (In Depth of the Stage), short story collection, Cheshmeh Publishers
 1999: Hatta Vaqti Mikhandidim (Even When We Were Laughing), short story collection
 2002: Parande-ye-man (My Bird), novel
 2006: Tarlan, novel
 2007: Rowya-ye-Tabbat (Dream of Tibet), novel,
 2008: Razi dar Kucheha (A Mystery at Alleys), novel
 2009: " Dar Rahe Vila "  (On the Way to the Vila ), short story collection
 2011: Hame-ye Ofoq (All the Horizon), short story collection
 2012: Mah Kamel Mishavad (The Moon is Getting Full), novel
 2014:  Baad az Payan  ( After the end ), novel
 2016:  Bi Baad Bi Parou  ( without Wind Without Oars ), short story collection
 2020: Rooz-e Digare Shoura (Another Day for Shoura), novel

References 

1963 births
Living people
Iranian fiction writers
People from Tabriz
Iranian women short story writers
21st-century Iranian women writers
Iranian novelists